Boyds is a passenger rail station on the MARC Brunswick Line in Boyds, Maryland, with direct service to Washington, D.C. and Martinsburg, WV (with an extension to Frederick, MD). The station is located west of a bridge over the MD 117–121 concurrency. Parking is available only on the south side of the tracks.

Boyds station includes a 1931-built pedestrian tunnel originally built by the Baltimore and Ohio Railroad.

Station layout
The station is not compliant with the Americans with Disabilities Act of 1990, lacking raised platforms for level boarding.

References

External links
 
 Boyds station official website
 Station from Google Maps Street View

Brunswick Line
Former Baltimore and Ohio Railroad stations
Railway stations in Montgomery County, Maryland
MARC Train stations